The 1962 Missouri Tigers baseball team represented University of Missouri in the 1962 NCAA University Division baseball season. The Tigers played their home games at Simmons Field. The team was coached by Hi Simmons in his 22nd year as head coach at Missouri.

The Tigers won the District V Playoff to advance to the College World Series, where they were defeated by the Santa Clara Broncos.

Roster

Schedule

|-
! style="" | Regular Season
|-

|-
! bgcolor="#DDDDFF" width="3%" | #
! bgcolor="#DDDDFF" width="7%" | Date
! bgcolor="#DDDDFF" width="14%" | Opponent
! bgcolor="#DDDDFF" width="25%" | Site/Stadium
! bgcolor="#DDDDFF" width="5%" | Score
! bgcolor="#DDDDFF" width="5%" | Overall Record
! bgcolor="#DDDDFF" width="5%" | Big 8 Record
|- align="center" bgcolor="#ccffcc"
| 1 || March 29 || at  || Unknown • Jonesboro, Arkansas || 9–2 || 1–0 || 0–0
|- align="center" bgcolor="#ccffcc"
| 2 || March 29 || at Arkansas State || Unknown • Jonesboro, Arkansas || 7–3 || 2–0 || 0–0
|-

|-
! bgcolor="#DDDDFF" width="3%" | #
! bgcolor="#DDDDFF" width="7%" | Date
! bgcolor="#DDDDFF" width="14%" | Opponent
! bgcolor="#DDDDFF" width="25%" | Site/Stadium
! bgcolor="#DDDDFF" width="5%" | Score
! bgcolor="#DDDDFF" width="5%" | Big 8 Record
! bgcolor="#DDDDFF" width="5%" | Overall Record
|- align="center" bgcolor="#ccffcc"
| 3 || April 2 ||  || Simmons Field • Columbia, Missouri || 15–7 || 3–0 || 0–0
|- align="center" bgcolor="#ccffcc"
| 4 || April 3 || Arkansas || Simmons Field • Columbia, Missouri || 10–4 || 4–0 || 0–0
|- align="center" bgcolor="#ccffcc"
| 5 || April 6 ||  || Simmons Field • Columbia, Missouri || 12–8 || 5–0 || 1–0
|- align="center" bgcolor="#ccffcc"
| 6 || April 7 || Iowa State || Simmons Field • Columbia, Missouri || 13–3 || 6–0 || 2–0
|- align="center" bgcolor="#ccffcc"
| 7 || April 7 || Iowa State || Simmons Field • Columbia, Missouri || 3–0 || 7–0 || 3–0
|- align="center" bgcolor="#ccffcc"
| 8 || April 13 || at  || Unknown • Boulder, Colorado || 9–1 || 8–0 || 4–0
|- align="center" bgcolor="#ffcccc"
| 9 || April 13 || at Colorado || Unknown • Boulder, Colorado || 0–4 || 8–1 || 4–1
|- align="center" bgcolor="#ccffcc"
| 10 || April 14 || at Colorado || Unknown • Boulder, Colorado || 10–7 || 9–1 || 5–1
|- align="center" bgcolor="#ffcccc"
| 11 || April 16 ||  || Simmons Field • Columbia, Missouri || 3–9 || 9–2 || 5–2
|- align="center" bgcolor="#ffcccc"
| 12 || April 17 || Kansas || Simmons Field • Columbia, Missouri || 0–8 || 9–3 || 5–3
|- align="center" bgcolor="#ccffcc"
| 13 || April 17 || Kansas || Simmons Field • Columbia, Missouri || 7–5 || 10–3 || 6–3
|- align="center" bgcolor="#ccffcc"
| 14 || April 27 || at  || Husker Diamond • Lincoln, Nebraska || 12–5 || 11–3 || 7–3
|- align="center" bgcolor="#ccffcc"
| 15 || April 27 || at Nebraska || Husker Diamond • Lincoln, Nebraska || 4–2 || 12–3 || 8–3
|- align="center" bgcolor="#ccffcc"
| 16 || April 28 || at Nebraska || Husker Diamond • Lincoln, Nebraska || 1–0 || 13–3 || 9–3

|-
! bgcolor="#DDDDFF" width="3%" | #
! bgcolor="#DDDDFF" width="7%" | Date
! bgcolor="#DDDDFF" width="14%" | Opponent
! bgcolor="#DDDDFF" width="25%" | Site/Stadium
! bgcolor="#DDDDFF" width="5%" | Score
! bgcolor="#DDDDFF" width="5%" | Overall Record
! bgcolor="#DDDDFF" width="5%" | Big 8 Record
|- align="center" bgcolor="#ffcccc"
| 17 || May 4 ||  || Simmons Field • Columbia, Missouri || 10–13 || 13–4 || 9–4
|- align="center" bgcolor="#ccffcc"
| 18 || May 4 || Oklahoma || Simmons Field • Columbia, Missouri || 9–6 || 14–4 || 10–4
|- align="center" bgcolor="#ccffcc"
| 19 || May 5 || Oklahoma || Simmons Field • Columbia, Missouri || 5–1 || 15–4 || 11–4
|- align="center" bgcolor="#ccffcc"
| 20 || May 11 || at  || KSU Baseball Stadium • Manhattan, Kansas || 15–4 || 16–4 || 12–4
|- align="center" bgcolor="#ccffcc"
| 21 || May 11 || at Kansas State || KSU Baseball Stadium • Manhattan, Kansas || 7–0 || 17–4 || 13–4
|- align="center" bgcolor="#ccffcc"
| 22 || May 12 || at Kansas State || KSU Baseball Stadium • Manhattan, Kansas || 8–5 || 18–4 || 14–4
|- align="center" bgcolor="#ccffcc"
| 23 || May 18 ||  || Unknown • Stillwater, Oklahoma || 7–4 || 19–4 || 15–4
|- align="center" bgcolor="#ccffcc"
| 24 || May 19 || Oklahoma State || Unknown • Stillwater, Oklahoma || 10–1 || 20–4 || 16–4
|- align="center" bgcolor="#ffcccc"
| 25 || May 19 || Oklahoma State || Unknown • Stillwater, Oklahoma || 2–8 || 20–5 || 16–5
|-

|-
! style="" | Postseason
|-

|-
! bgcolor="#DDDDFF" width="3%" | #
! bgcolor="#DDDDFF" width="7%" | Date
! bgcolor="#DDDDFF" width="14%" | Opponent
! bgcolor="#DDDDFF" width="25%" | Site/Stadium
! bgcolor="#DDDDFF" width="5%" | Score
! bgcolor="#DDDDFF" width="5%" | Overall Record
! bgcolor="#DDDDFF" width="5%" | Big 8 Record
|- align="center" bgcolor="#ccffcc"
| 26 || June 4 ||  || Simmons Field • Columbia, Missouri || 3–1 || 21–5 || 16–5
|- align="center" bgcolor="#ccffcc"
| 27 || June 4 || Bradley || Simmons Field • Columbia, Missouri || 9–4 || 22–5 || 16–5
|-

|-
! bgcolor="#DDDDFF" width="3%" | #
! bgcolor="#DDDDFF" width="7%" | Date
! bgcolor="#DDDDFF" width="14%" | Opponent
! bgcolor="#DDDDFF" width="25%" | Site/Stadium
! bgcolor="#DDDDFF" width="5%" | Score
! bgcolor="#DDDDFF" width="5%" | Overall Record
! bgcolor="#DDDDFF" width="5%" | Big 8 Record
|- align="center" bgcolor="#ffcccc"
| 28 || June 11 || vs Ithaca || Omaha Municipal Stadium • Omaha, Nebraska || 1–5 || 22–6 || 16–5
|- align="center" bgcolor="#ffcccc"
| 29 || June 12 || vs Santa Clara || Omaha Municipal Stadium • Omaha, Nebraska || 4–7 || 22–7 || 16–5
|-

|-
|

Awards and honors
Larry Bohannon
All-Big Eight Conference

George Hulett
All-Big Eight Conference

Bobby Jenkins,
All-Big Eight Conference

Dan Reilly
All District V Team
All-Big Eight Conference

References

Missouri Tigers baseball seasons
Missouri Tigers baseball
College World Series seasons
Missouri
Big Eight Conference baseball champion seasons